Campylarchis is a genus of moths in the Carposinidae family. It contains the single species Campylarchis acuta, which is found in Philippines (Luzon).

References

Natural History Museum Lepidoptera generic names catalog

Carposinidae
Monotypic moth genera